The Nissan ZD30 engine family is a 3.0-litre (2,953 cc) inline-four cylinder diesel engine with a bore and stroke of 96 mm × 102 mm (3.78 in × 4.02 in), that replaced the Nissan QD, BD and TD engines. At Renault it also replaced the Sofim 8140 engine and is the only truck diesel engine which remained with Nissan Motors when they sold Nissan Diesel to Volvo trucks in 2007.

It features a cast-iron crank case, which is horizontally divided in the crank shaft plane into a lower and an upper part. A set of gear driven balance shafts is located slightly higher than the crankshaft, the vacuum pump is placed on the gear cover and driven by the RH (intake side) balance shaft. The Gerotor oil pump is also located on the front side of the crankshaft. A Serpentine belt with hydraulic tensioner powers the a/c compressor, the water pump and (via a freewheeling pulley to reduce squeaking when engine decelerates) the alternator. A Dual-mass flywheel may be used with manual transmissions.

The aluminium-alloy Crossflow cylinder head houses two camshafts (DOHC) driven by a combined gear and chain drive operating 4 valves per cylinder (16 in total) by bucket tappets. Exhaust is on the LH side which makes an “exhaust forward” arrangement when the engine is installed transversally. Even the first series of “mechanical” engines have an ECU with Electronic throttle control (Drive by wire), MAF sensor (not for all engines with 96 kW and below), advanced lube oil monitoring etc. Turbocharged and intercooled engines have Swirl flaps incorporated into the intake manifold to improve combustion at low revs.

The original versions of this engine were introduced in 1999 (MY 2000) utilizing a VP44 distributor  injection pump and represent the transition from the former naturally aspirated all mechanical ohv engines with swirl combustion chamber (except the truck engine BD30 with direct injection) to the later 2nd generation common rail DOHC design. The ECU's functionality has been improved during the life time of this first generation and with the introduction of the later Common Rail engines.

ZD30DD 
On the Nissan Caravan with manual transmission torque was limited to ). Application:
 04/2001-08/2004 Nissan Caravan/Urvan/Homy E25 and rebadged as Isuzu Como

 2002–2008 Thairung NISSAN FREELIFE

ZD30DDT 
Application:
 2001–2006 Nissan Navara/Frontier D22
 2002–2008 Thairung NISSAN SUPER XCITER

1st Generation ZD30DDTI (2000–2006) 
This engine was upgraded with an intercooler and still utilized a VP44 distributor injection pump, which may create confusion because later Common Rail engines have the same engine denomination. Several power levels were available.

1.)  at 3200 rpm,  at 1600-3200 rpm
 09/2002-08/2004 Nissan Caravan/Urvan/Homy E25, also rebadged as Isuzu Como

2.)  at 3450 rpm,  at 1600-3450 rpm
 08/2004-~2007 Nissan Caravan/Urvan/Homy E25, also rebadged as Isuzu Como

3.)  at 3600 rpm,  resp.  (MT) at 1800 rpm
 09/1999-08/2002 Nissan Patrol Y61

4.)  at 3600 rpm,  at 1800 rpm
 02/1999-08/2002 Nissan Pathfinder/Terrano R50
 1999- Nissan Terrano II R20 (Europe only)
 08/1999-05/2002 Elgrand E50

2nd Generation ZD30DDTI CRD/Common Rail Injection (07/2007-…) 
This major revision of the ZD30 became available in MY 2007. At that time the previously offered TD42TI was discontinued due to failing updated EURO IV emission standards and was replaced by the commonrail ZD30DDTI engine. Bosch injection equipment was utilized with a 1600 bar system pressure and an improved ECU. Compression ratio was 17.9:1, to keep emissions low a hot EGR with heat exchanger was also installed. 

1.) The common rail ZD30 engines were first seen on Renault Master and Renault Mascott in 2004, three years before the introduction by Nissan. The Renault Master is the only known transversal installation of this engine. By Renault the engines may have been named ZD3 or DXI 3.
2004-2007 Renault Mascott,  at 3600 rpm,  at 1300 rpm
2004-2007 Renault Mascott,  at 3600 rpm,  at 1500 rpm

2.)
 2007–2010 Renault Mascott
 2007-06/2012 Nissan Caravan/Urvan/Homy E25, also rebadged as Isuzu Como
 2007- Nissan NT400/Atlas F24, also rebadged as UD / Condor CARGO, Isuzu Elf 100, Mitsubishi Fuso Canter Guts

3.)
 2007–2010 Renault Mascott
 2006–2013 Nissan Atleon (Euro V/EEV) (for 3.5 ton and 5.6 ton GVWR models)
 2007- Nissan NT400/Atlas F24, also rebadged as UD / Condor CARGO, Isuzu Elf 100, Mitsubishi Fuso Canter Guts
 06/2008-07/2010 Nissan Civilian W41, also rebadged as Isuzu Journey
 2013-~2018 Nissan NT500 (successor of the Atleon)

ZD30DDTT 
This engine is based on the 2nd generation ZD30DDTI but features twin turbo charging, Euro VI,  at 2600 rpm,  at 1400–2200 rpm.
 2013-~2018 Nissan NT500 (successor of the Atleon)

Remark 
There is also a ZD25 engine built in China, where it is also known as the DK4A diesel engine. With a  bore and stroke, it displaces  and produces  in with common rail injection and an intercooler.

See also 
List of Nissan engines

References 

ZD
Straight-four engines
Diesel engines by model